The pigment spot ocellus is an ocellus that contains only part of its cells pigmented. It is characteristic of jellyfish, sea stars, and flatworms.

References

Eye
Echinoderm anatomy
Cnidarian anatomy
Protostome anatomy